A clipboard manager is a computer program that adds functionality to an operating system's clipboard. Many clipboards provide only one buffer for the "copy and paste" function, and it is overwritten by each new "copy" operation. The main task of a clipboard manager is to store data copied to the clipboard in a way that permits extended use of the data.

Clipboard managers enhance the basic functions of cut, copy, and paste operations with one or more of the following features:
 Multiple buffers and the ability to merge, split, and edit their contents
 Selecting which buffer "cut" or "copy" operations should store data in
 Selecting which buffer(s) "paste" operations should take data from
 Handling formatted text, tabular data, data objects, media content, and URLs
 Saving copied data to long term storage
 Indexing or tagging of clipped data
 Searching of saved data

Sharing clipboard contents remotely is sometimes done with pastebins.

Copy history

Some clipboard managers allow the user to keep multiple clipped objects, available for later use. Some keep a clipping history by automatically making a new buffer for each new cut or copy operation.

Some applications have an internal copy history feature. This has been a standard feature in UNIX editors like vi and emacs for some time. Recent versions of Microsoft Office have included the "Office Clipboard", a built-in clipboard manager, which operates as long as one of the Office suite applications is open.

In different systems

Windows 
The default Microsoft Windows clipboard manager enables pasting the copied data, even after an application is closed, by maintaining the clip buffer itself. Its copying and pasting operations are very versatile in what they permit to be transferred between applications. A range of cells clipped from an Excel sheet can be pasted as a table into MS Word or LibreOffice Writer. Formatted text clipped from a web page will become cells in an Excel sheet, a table in MS Word, or plain text in Text Edit.

ClipBook Viewer is a discontinued utility included in the Windows NT family until the release of Windows Vista.

Windows versions prior to the Windows 10 October 2018 Update do not offer a copy history feature. In these versions a third-party clipboard manager that replaces the default clipboard is required for extended functionality. The Windows 10 October 2018 Update introduced a new Cloud Clipboard feature which does offer copy history, as well as the ability to sync this history for access on other devices.

Mac OS X 
Mac OS X also has a host of third-party options for clipboard management.

CopyPaste was the first (1997) multiple clipboard utility, the only for many years and is still actively developed. (Shareware)
CopyPaste was first  reviewed in 1997 by Tidbits. and also by WIRED.

Clipboard managers for Mac OS X use the Dock, status bar or Dashboard to integrate with the Mac Look and Feel.

Linux 
The freedesktop.org Clipboard Manager specification describes a protocol layered on top of the ICCCM clipboard spec for client applications. A daemon process is responsible for storing clipboard contents. This daemon clipboard manager must be provided by the window manager running in the user's X session. The client-side specification has native support in a number of toolkits, including GTK.

The Linux desktop environment KDE ships with Klipper.

GNOME provides a basic clipboard manager function as part of the gnome-control-center (accessed via the gnome-settings-daemon), that supports the freedesktop.org Clipboard Manager Specification.

List of clipboard software 

Notable clipboard software include:

References

Manager
Data management software